William Henry "Yank" Collier was an American football coach.  He was the tenth head football coach at The Apprentice Schoolin Newport News, Virginia  and he held that position for two seasons, from 1938 until 1939.  His coaching record at Apprentice was 6–11–1.

References

Year of birth missing
Year of death missing
The Apprentice Builders football coaches